James Quirk may refer to:
James P. Quirk (1926–2020), American economist 
James R. Quirk (1884–1932), American magazine editor
Jamie Quirk (born 1954), American baseball player
James Quirk (Isle of Man), High Bailiff of Douglas, Isle of Man 1817-1820